Mastermind-like protein 1 is a protein that in humans is encoded by the MAML1 gene.

Function 

This protein is the human homolog of mastermind, a Drosophila protein that plays a role in the Notch signaling pathway involved in cell-fate determination. There is in vitro evidence that the human homolog forms a complex with the intracellular portion of human Notch receptors and can increase expression of a Notch-induced gene. This evidence supports its proposed function as a transcriptional co-activator in the Notch signaling pathway.

Details on the activity of the N-terminal domain of Mastermind-like protein 1
may be found under MamL-1.

Interactions 

MAML1 has been shown to interact with EP300 and NOTCH1.

References

Further reading